= Gabriela Prado case =

2003 death during a robbery in Rio de Janeiro

Gabriela Prado Case
- Location: Rio de Janeiro, Rio de Janeiro Brazil
- Date: March 25, 2003
- Attack type: Armed robbery
- Deaths: 3
- Victims: Gabriela Prado Maia Ribeiro, Renato Lemos Naiff, Luiz Carlos da Costa Carvalho Neto
- Accused: Luiz Augusto Castro de Souza, Carlos Eduardo Soares Ramalho, Rafael Gomes ("Gago"), Paulo de Souza Magalhães da Silva ("Paulinho")

The Gabriela Prado case refers to the murder of young Gabriela Prado Maia Ribeiro on March 25, 2003, in Rio de Janeiro. The case mobilized a campaign that took to the National Congress a document with proposed changes aimed at altering several items of the Brazilian Penal Code. Thanks to the tragedy, 1.2 million signatures were collected.

== The Case ==
On March 25, 2003, around 3:30 pm, a group of four robbers (Luiz Augusto Castro de Souza, Carlos Eduardo Soares Ramalho, Rafael Gomes, "Gago" and Paulo de Souza Magalhães da Silva, "Paulinho") stole R. $619 from the ticket office at the São Francisco Xavier subway station, in Tijuca, plus travel tickets and transportation vouchers. Luiz Carlos and Carlos Eduardo, with firearms, defeated two ticket agents and a security guard, making them hand over all the money they had at the box office. Luiz Augusto and Paulo, also with firearms, remained close to the box office to ensure the action was carried out. Then, the gang came across Renato Lemos Naiff, a civil police officer from the Federal District who was there to buy a ticket. Upon realizing that the policeman had a volume under his shirt and imagining it to be a weapon, Carlos Eduardo subdued him, applying a tie to him. Luiz Carlos then fired several shots at Naiff, causing serious bodily harm. With the policeman on the ground, Carlos Eduardo grabbed his gun. When they were on the run, the group overtook Luiz Carlos da Costa Carvalho Neto, a civil police officer from Rio who was going down the stairs, and shots were exchanged, which wounded the policeman and shot student Gabriela Prado Maia Ribeiro, who was also going down the stairs at the time. Soon after, on Rua Doutor Satamini, Luiz Augusto, Luiz Carlos and Paulo stole a Chevrolet Astra vehicle. The rest fled along the subway tracks.

=== Support and solidarity ===
In the days that followed the tragedy, Gabriela's parents were consoled by many people, including famous people like the writer Glória Perez, who also suffered an irreparable loss with the brutal murder of her daughter Daniela Perez in 1992, a fact that generated a campaign headed by Glória, which resulted in the first popular initiative in Brazil with the inclusion of homicide in the Heinous Crimes Law.

=== Farewell to Gabriela ===
On April 6, 2003, Gabriela's parents threw their daughter's ashes into the waters at Barra da Tijuca beach (the body was cremated on March 27), in a tribute that included the participation of several other people, such as the Gabriela's classmates.
